The Schynige Platte Railway (SPB) is a mountain railway in the Bernese Highlands area of Switzerland, which connects the town of Wilderswil, near Interlaken, with the famous wildflower gardens of the Schynige Platte.

An impressively and varied natural landscape unfolds on the journey, including forests, Alpine pastures and views of the Bernese Oberland. Towards the top of the line, there are also views of the imposing peaks of the Eiger, Mönch and Jungfrau. The line opened, using steam traction, in May 1893, and was electrified in 1914.

The line is owned by the Berner Oberland-Bahnen AG, a company that also owns the Berner Oberland-Bahn. Through that company it is part of the Allianz - Jungfrau Top of Europe marketing alliance, which also includes the separately owned Wengernalpbahn, Jungfraubahn, Bergbahn Lauterbrunnen–Mürren, Harderbahn, and Firstbahn.

History

The key milestones in the history of the line are:

1890 The concession for the line was given and the company is founded on 16 September.
1891 Construction starts.
1893 A train with special guests reaches the top on 5 May and the line opens to the public on 14 June.
1896 The Berner Oberland-Bahn become the new owners.
1913 The first electric trial run operates on 15 October.
1914 Public electric services start on 9 May.
1928 The Schynige Platte Alpine Garden opens on the Schynige Platte.
1964 The Schynige Platte Railway receives 4 locomotives from the Wengernalpbahn.
1970 The Schynige Platte Railway receives 2 more locomotives from the Wengernalpbahn.
1978 The Schynige Platte Railway receives another locomotive from the Wengernalpbahn.
2001 Teddyland opens on the Schynige Platte on 7 June.

Route

Wilderswil is within the built-up area around Interlaken, and buses also provide a connection from the station to the town centre and Interlaken West station.

The line initially runs alongside the BOB for just over  before crossing the Lütschine river and starting its climb up the valley side. The forest is followed by alpine pastures which offer views of the Bernese Oberland including the town of Interlaken bracketed by Lake Thun and Lake Brienz.

In the final stretch of the ascent, views open up of the glistening giants of the Eiger, Mönch and Jungfrau mountains to the south. The Schynige Platte alpine botanical garden, a hotel and a mountain restaurant are all located near the summit station.

Operation
The Schynige Platte Railway is built to 800 mm gauge ( gauge) and is electrified using a 1500 V DC overhead supply. It is a rack railway, using the Riggenbach rack with a maximum gradient of 25% (1 in 4). The line's depot and workshops are located adjacent to Wilderswil station.

The line is timetabled to only operate in summer months, from the beginning of June to the middle of October. As the upper section of the route, between Breitlauenen and the summit, is subject to heavy winter snowfall and occasional avalanches, the overhead catenary on this section is dismantled after the last train of the year, and reinstated before the first train of the next year can run. The process of removal or replacement normally takes a team of six employees a day to complete, and employs the line's one remaining steam locomotive.

The line provides some 15 return services per day, with services every 40 minutes and a journey time of 52 minutes. Any given service may be operated by a convoy of more than one train, with each train usually comprising an electric rack locomotive and two coaches. The locomotive always operates at the lower end of the train, pushing the train up the mountain and leading it down.

Rolling stock
The line still operates one of its original steam locomotives, together with the four electric locomotives built for the line's electrification. A number of additional similar locomotives, together with matching coaches, were bought from the Wengernalpbahn but had (until the recent delivery of additional train sets) often returned to this line to help in winter sports traffic.

The line uses, or has used, the following locomotives:
 

In 1992, the company started a rebuilding program for 12 coaches. These coaches carry the numbers 41–52 (41–42 sit on the original underframes number 2 and 4, the others on underframes ex-WAB). Of the original stock numbers 6–8 (1894, 1924, 1929) with open compartments and 21–22 (1929, 1931) fully closed compartment coaches were kept and complemented with numbers 3 (open, 1893), 23 and 24 (closed, 1898, 1901) ex-WAB (last WAB numbers 3, 22, 24). This allows to build 10 consists of a locomotive with 2 coaches (see above, Operations). Original coaches 1 and 5 were scrapped in 1970 and 68, number 3 rebuilt as flat car (new number 91).

See also
List of mountain railways in Switzerland
List of heritage railways and funiculars in Switzerland

References

Bibliography 
 Brawand Hansruedi, Schynige Platte-Bahn, Die Bergstrecke der Berner Oberland-Bahnen, Mit nostalgischem Cachet. Prellbock Verlag, Leissigen, 2003, 
 Book Tramways and Light Railways of Switzerland and Austria, by R.J.Buckley, published by the Light Rail Transit Association, 1984.

External links 

 Schynige Platte on the website of Jungfrau Railway Holding AG.
 Some Photographs and a brief description

800 mm gauge railways in Switzerland
Mountain railways
Railway lines in Switzerland
Defunct railway companies of Switzerland
Bernese Oberland
Rack railways in Switzerland
Transport in the canton of Bern
1500 V DC railway electrification
Heritage railways in Switzerland